The 2003 International Songwriting Competition was a songwriting competition held in 2003.

Award recipients

Grand prize
"Moko" – Moana

Pop/Top 40
First place
"Latin Queen" – Graciela “Chela” Alvarado
Second place
"Love Replaces Love" – Robert Baier

Rock
First place
"We Were Stars" – Tara Slone and Jordon Zadorozny
Second place
"Without" – Christopher Sernel

Folk/Singer-songwriter
First place
"Blowing This Candle Out" – Jane Taylor
Second place
"Hey Mister" – Suzanna Choffel

AAA/Roots/Americana
First place
"Dark As The Night" – Doug Burr
Second place
"Tennessee" – Alison MacLean and Stella Panacci

Dance/Electronica
First place
"Hero" – Mike MacFarland and Shannon Savoie
Second place
"Fire!" – Donny B. Lord and Paco

World music
First place
"Forbidden Love" – Ishay Amir
Second place
"Bifurcacoes" – Toti

Blues
First place
"Riley Wants His Life Back" – Rick Fines and Alec Fraser
Second place
"Strong Medicine" – Peter Gelling

Jazz
First place
"The Heckler" – Ben Castle
Second place
"Line Game" – Steve Kirby

Gospel/Christian
First place
"All That I Know" – Peter Lawlor (Stiltskin)
Second place
"I Was Carried" – Roma Waterman

R&B/Hip-hop
First place
"Remind My Soul" – Jared Bridgeman
Second place
"Rufus" – Yewande Austin

Country
First place
"Let Me Out Here" – Cindy Kalmenson and Lisa Carver
Second place
"Tomorrow Tonight" – David Rivers, Sue Fabisch, and Steve Christopher

Lyrics only
First place
"Skylight" – Paul Brill
Second place
"Longshot" – Kate Dwyer and Scott Johnson

Teen
Best song
"Wounded Spirit" – Rachel MacGregor
Best lyrics
"Memories" – Mihad Ali

Peoples' voice
"Let Me Become Me" – Erik Ashley

References
 

Songwriting competitions
2003 in music